The Kamchik Pass, also spelt Kamchiq or Qamchiq, is a mountain pass in the Qurama Mountains in eastern Uzbekistan. The pass provides a strategically important route as an access for ground transport traveling between the Tashkent and Namangan Regions in the Fergana Valley bypassing neighboring Tajikistan. It connects the capital city of Tashkent with Osh, the second-largest city in neighboring Kyrgyzstan.

Route
For centuries, the Kamchik Pass was part of Central Asia's Silk Road trade route that connected the markets of Asia and Europe. The Tashkent-Osh (A373) international highway now winds through the pass. Approximately 10,000 to 15,000 vehicles travel through the Kamchik Pass each day.

Weather

The Kamchik Pass is frequently closed in the winter due to avalanche hazards. Mudslides and landslides are also threats to vehicles along the route and the nearby villages. In February 2015, the United Nations Development Programme announced it would help aid a disaster risk-reduction project for the Kamchik Pass. The plan is to improve an early warning monitoring system, emergency assistance and education for the people living in remote and rural disaster-prone regions nearby. The project is funded by the European Commission's Humanitarian Aid and Civil Protection Department (ECHO).

Railway pass

In March 2013, Uzbek Railways announced plans to build a new railway through the Kamchik Pass to allow freight traffic to bypass neighboring Tajikistan. The new rail allows Uzbekistan to abandon the Soviet-era line that cuts across Tajikistan's Sughd Region, saving Uzbekistan a reported $25 million in transit fees it pays to Tajikistan each year. The line opened in 2016.

See also
Kamchiq Tunnel

References

Mountain passes of Uzbekistan
Sites along the Silk Road